KIHH (1400 AM) is a radio station broadcasting a Catholic format. Licensed to Eureka, California, the station serves the Humboldt Bay area. The station is owned by Relevant Radio, Inc.

History
This station was set to launch in 2003, but had to face several setbacks such as financial troubles and transmitter location issues. KIHH is the only Catholic-programmed station in Humboldt Bay.

References

External links

IHH
Catholic radio stations
Radio stations established in 2008
Mass media in Humboldt County, California
2008 establishments in California
Relevant Radio stations
IHH